Sandford is an unincorporated community in Fayette Township, Vigo County, in the U.S. state of Indiana. The community is part of the Terre Haute Metropolitan Statistical Area.

History
Sandford was established in 1854 at the state line between Illinois and Indiana. With the building of the Indianapolis & St. Louis Railroad, it became an important town in the area. In 1890 it had a population of approximately 250.

A post office was established at Sandford in 1855, and remained in operation until  1995.

On Jan. 19, 1907, at least 30 people were killed when nitroglycerin exploded in a freight car as a passenger train passed.

Geography

References

Unincorporated communities in Vigo County, Indiana
Unincorporated communities in Indiana
Terre Haute metropolitan area